Veteran Feminists of America (VFA) is a 501(c)(3) charitable organization for supporters  and veterans of the second-wave feminist movement. Founded by Jacqueline Ceballos in 1992, Veteran Feminists of America regularly hosts reunions for second-wave feminists and events honoring feminist leaders.

VFA's major effort is the Pioneer Histories Project, the personal history of the Second Wave women's movement, one story at a time.  Interviews with hundreds of feminist activists are featured on the VFA webpage.  Support for the Project is provided by the Sy Syms Foundation.

VFA Mission statement

The purpose of Veteran Feminists of America is to honor, record and preserve the history of the accomplishments of women active in the feminist movement, to educate the public on the importance of the changes brought about by the women's movement, to preserve the movement's history and to inspire future generations.

History

The Veteran Feminists of America was created with the goals of remembering and recording the faces and retrospectives of the hundreds of pioneers who launched the 1960s feminist movement, often called second-wave feminism.

At first, VFA gatherings consisted of a time and place to meet and reminisce, followed by an awards dinner captured for posterity on video.  Those videotapes are now archived at the Schlesinger Library at the Radcliffe Institute and the Sallie Bingham Center for Women's History and Culture at Duke University. Soon after their first reunion in 1992, Jacqueline Ceballos joined with Dorothy Senerchia and Mary Jean Tully to create the organization. Muriel Fox joined soon thereafter and has chaired the organization since 1994.

The original idea for a name, Veterans of Feminist Wars, was rejected because its acronym could be confused with that of the Veterans of Foreign Wars organization.

During its first decade, VFA mainly honored individuals and groups for their work in establishing national and local organizations, raising public awareness about feminist issues, and lobbying for women's rights. In time, VFA's events spread geographically and reached into new areas across the country.

In 1998, VFA Board member Barbara Love, with help from VFA members, began compiling a directory of feminists, published in 2006 as Feminists Who Changed America: 1963-1975 (University of Illinois Press). The book is a collection of 2,220 biographies of second-wave feminists who accomplished significant activist work. It is also available as a searchable CD. Feminists Who Changed America—along with the videos from two decades of retrospective events—brings to life the history of feminism's second wave. It is meant to help to ensure that the achievements of the women's movement are not forgotten.

VFA has a new partnership with the New York Historical Society Museum & Library.  Its newly created Center for Women's History will be the venue to showcase the artifacts and stories that document modern feminism.

Notable VFA Officers and Board members
Officers
 Eleanor Pam, President
 Muriel Fox, Chair of the Board

Special Portfolios
 Heather Booth, Liaison/Outreach

Board of Directors
 Virginia Carter
 Roxanne Barton Conlin
 Carol Jenkins
 Barbara Love
 Linda Stein

Board Advisor 
 Gloria Steinem

Founder 
 Jacqui Ceballos

Events

On February 4, 2021, VFA held a Zoom webinar honoring NOW founder Betty Friedan on the 100th anniversary of her birth (and the 15th anniversary of her death).  "Betty Friedan's 100 Birthday:  Moving the Legacy Forward".

VFA has held a number of events honoring second-wave feminists, including:

 May 26, 1993 – VFA's debut.  Honoring Catherine East.  Seventh Regiment Armory, New York City.
 December 1993 – Honoring Flo Kennedy.  Seventh Regiment Armory, New York City.
 May 1994 – Honoring Congresswoman Martha Griffiths.  Also honored were Betty Friedan, Gene Boyer, Nan Wood, Virginia Allen, Evelyn Cunningham and others.  Sewall-Belmont House, Washington, D.C.
 Fall 1994 – Honoring Congresswoman Bella Abzug.  Seventh Regiment Armory, New York City
 Spring 1995 – Marriage and Family with Coalition for Family Justice.  Irvington, New York.
 December 13, 1995 – Honoring Gloria Steinem.  Seventh Regiment Armory, New York City.
 November 21 and 22, 1996 – Celebrating NOW's 30th anniversary and honoring NOW founders.  Barnard College and Seventh Regiment Armory, New York City
 December 13, 1997 – Celebrating the women's liberation movement. Speakers included Heather Booth, Jo Freeman, Susan Brownmiller, and Alix Kates Shulman.  Seventh Regiment Armory, New York City.
 April 1998 – Honoring great feminists, including Gerda Lerner, Betty Harragan and Midge Kovacs.  Seventh Regiment Armory, New York City.
 November 7, 1998 – Honoring Kate Millett.  Seventh Regiment Armory, New York City.
 May 1999 – Honoring a number of feminists, including Donna Allen, Tina Hobson, Elizabeth Boyer, Vera Glaser, Arvonne Frazer, Carmen Delgado Votaw and others.  Washington DC
 November 12, 1999 – Honoring Betty Friedan.  National Arts Club, New York City.
 April 28, 2000 – "Spring Reunion – VFA Celebrates Some Of Our National Treasures."  Honorees included Jean Ledwith King, Patricia Schroeder, Patricia Ireland, Cathryn Adamsky, Mary Gereau, Joy Simonson, Ruth McLean and others.  Sewall-Belmont House, Washington, D.C. 
 October 18, 2000 – Celebrating 30th Anniversary of Women's Strike for Equality.  "Veteran Feminists Recall Past Battles, Gaze Ahead."  Participants included Karen DeCrow, Susan Brownmiller, Kate Millett, Carole DeSaram, Jacqui Ceballos and others.  Seventh Regiment Armory, New York City.
 March 2001 – Celebrating Louisiana Feminists.  Honorees included Roberta Madden, Sylvia Roberts and Karline Tierney.  Newcomb College, New Orleans, LA
 June 9, 2001 – Celebrating Heroes of Women's Studies.  Honorees included Lois Gould, Lois Herr, Lenor Weizmann, Renata Bridenthal, Louise Knight, Florence Howe and others.  Barnard College, New York City.
 April 6, 2002 – "Women Speak Out NOW:  Defining the Past, Confronting the Present, Shaping the Future" conference.  Honored pioneer feminists of Florida.  Florida Atlantic University, Boca Raton.
 April 26, 2002 – "Salute to Feminist Authors: Celebrating Feminist Writers who Changed the World, 1966–1985."  Honored Erica Jong, Barbara Seaman, Letty Pogrebin, Marilyn French, Marlene Sanders and others.  Barnard College, New York City.
 November 8, 2002 – "A Conference To Celebrate And Evaluate The Effects Of Thirty Years Of Title IX."  Among those present were Bernice Sandler, Holly Knox and Jean King.  Baltimore, Maryland.
 November 6, 2003 – "Celebrating Feminist Artists Who Changed The World, 1966–1980."  Artists present included Suzanne Benton, Gloria Orenstein, Cristine Biaggi, Patricia Burnett, Karen LeCocq, Arlene Raven, Fern Shaffer, Sylvia Sleigh and others.  The National Arts Club, New York City.
 May 2004 – Celebrating 40 years of Title VII.  Panelists included Eleanor Clift, Aileen Hernandez, Lorena Weeks and William H. Brown.  Newton, Massachusetts.
 August 27 and 28, 2004 – "Unfinished Business of the Women's Movement – Dangers and Opportunities." This first Midwest VFA event was dedicated to the late Gene Boyer.  University of Illinois at Chicago, Chicago.
 April 16, 2005 – "Feminism And Its Values:  An Intergenerational Dialogue."  Honoring Connecticut feminists, including Ruthe Boyea, Barbara Lifton, Kay Bergin, Susan Yolen and others.  Cromwell, Connecticut.
 May 2006 – Honoring Helen Reddy.  Event on day two honored California feminists and paid special tribute to Judith Meuli.  Feminist Majority building, Los Angeles.
 November 13, 2006 – Two-day event celebrating the debut of "Feminists Who Changed America, 1963–1975" and honoring editor Barbara Love.  Also present were Cheryl Redmon and Bettye Lane.  Columbia University and Barnard College, New York City.
 May 6, 2007 – Saluting Arizona feminists.  Among honorees were Janet Elsea, Muriel Magenta, Himilce Novas, Nola Claire, Bette Adelman, Susan Koppelman and others.  Phoenix, Arizona.
 October 13, 2007 – Celebrating Washington, DC-area feminists, including Helen Thomas.  Sewall-Belmont House, Washington, D.C.
 June 9, 2008 – "Salute to Feminist Lawyers, 1963–1975."  Honorees included Supreme Court Justice Ruth Bader Ginsburg, Sylvia Roberts, Emily Goodman, Jan Goodman, Faith Seidenberg, Doris Sassower, Sonia Fuentes and Karen DeCrow.  Harvard Club, New York City.
 April 20, 2009 – Honoring Florida feminists.  Speaker was Patricia Ireland, former president of NOW.  Palm Aire Country Club, Pompano Beach.
 August 27, 2009 – Stockton (California) Celebration Of Women's Equality Day.  Honored Northern California feminists.  Stockton, California.
 March 2010 – "The Gender Agenda:  Beyond Borders – Pursuing Women's Rights at Home and Abroad."  Honored Texas activists including Sissy Farenthold, Virginia Whitehill, Winnie Wackowitz, Moira McNiel, Catalina Garcia and others.  Women's Museum, Dallas.
 June 17, 2011 – Tribute to Betty Friedan on the 45th anniversary of NOW and the Feminine Mystique.  National Arts Building, New York City.
 October 28 and 29, 2011 – "Day of Dialogue With Feminist Heroes."  Rollins College students were paired with VFA members and a gala dinner honored Florida feminists.  Lifetime Achievement Awards were presented to Terry O'Neill, Sherrill Redmon and Barbara Love.  Rollins College, Orlando.
 June 24, 2012  – "A Love Fest For Kate Millett."  Speakers included Gloria Steinem, Terry O'Neill, Susan Brownmiller, Alix Kates Shulman, Barbara Love, and Noreen Connell.  Judson Church, New York City.
 September 15, 2012 – "Empowering Women: A Tale Of Two Generations."  Speakers included Congresswoman Gwen Moore, Lynn Povich, Jesse Ellison, Kathleen Falk, Dr. Mary Meehan and Judy Goldsmith. Midwest feminists were honored.  Alverno College. Milwaukee.
 February 27, 2013 – "On The Front Lines Of Feminism" panel discussion.  Participants included Eleanor Pam, Syd Beiner, Mary Vasiliades and Marilyn Fitterman.  Sandy Rapp performed.  Ft. Lauderdale, Florida.
 September 7, 2013 – "Women and Media" and VFA's 20th anniversary celebration.  Honorees included David Dismore, Gloria Allred, Helen Reddy, June Millington, Carol Downer, Linda Perkins, Joannie Parker and Tucker Reed.  Sheraton Universal Hotel, Los Angeles.
 September 27, 2014 – "Labor & the Women's Movement: The untold story and why it matters."  Speakers included Alice Kessler-Harris, Brigid O'Farrell, Emily LaBarbera Twarog, Karen Nussbaum, Sarita Gupta, Carmen Berkley and others.  Missouri feminists were honored.  Renaissance Grand Hotel, St. Louis.
 October 21, 2014 – A lifetime achievement award was presented to Muriel Fox for her years of commitment to women's issues.  Also receiving VFA Spirit Awards and VFA's Medal of Honor were Gloria Steinem, Rosie O'Donnell, Marlo Thomas, Eve Ensler and Carol Jenkins.  Harvard Club, New York City.
 March 31, 2017 – "Sharing Our Stories:  The Second Wave Feminist Movement."  Keynote speaker was Dr. Nancy MacLean.  Through three panel discussions, second wave activists and young historians had an intergenerational conversation to ensure that the full history of the movement is told and remembered.  Southern feminists were honored.  Hilton Durham Hotel, Durham, NC.
 June 10, 2017 – "Feminist Reunion 2017 – We Won't Go Back."  Among those attending were Kate Millett, Susan Brownmiller, Yolanda Bako, Alix Kates Shulman, Heather Booth and Muriel Fox.  Highlight was a Speak Out at an open mic guided by Carole DeSaram.  Judson Memorial Church, New York City. 
 November 9, 2017 – Memorial Service for Kate Millett – About 500 people attended the celebration of life for Kate Millett.  Speakers included Gloria Steinem, Yoko Ono, Holly Near, Eleanor Pam and Kathleen Turner.  Fourth Universalist Society Unitarian Universal Church, New York City.

See also
List of feminists
List of women's rights activists
List of women's rights organizations

References

External links
Veteran Feminists of America official site
Veteran Feminists of America Pioneer Histories Project, a list of second-wave feminists with biographies
Records, 1993-2007. Schlesinger Library, Radcliffe Institute, Harvard University.
Preliminary Inventory of the Veteran Feminists of America Records, 1972-2010, Duke University Libraries.

Organizations established in 1992
Non-profit organizations based in Arizona
Feminism and history
Feminist organizations in the United States